Estampes ("Prints"), L.100, is a composition for solo piano by Claude Debussy. It was finished in 1903. The first performance of the work was given by Ricardo Viñes at the Société Nationale de Musique in Paris. This three-movement piano suite is impressionistic.

Structure
Estampes is a suite containing three movements:

I. Pagodes
Pagodes evokes Indonesian gamelan music, which Debussy first heard in the Paris World Conference Exhibition of 1889. It makes extensive use of pentatonic scales and mimics traditional Indonesian melodies. Four different pentatonic scales are incorporated within the piece, further defining the imagery of the pagoda. Pagodas are Oriental temples with petite bases that give rise to ornate roofs that typically curve upwards, much like the ascending melodic line (G, C, D) which serves as a repeated motive through different portions of the piece.

As this is an Impressionistic work, the goal is not overt expressiveness but instead an emphasis on the wash of color presented by the texture of the work. Debussy marks in the text that "Pagodes" should be played "presque sans nuance", or "almost without nuance." This rigidity of rhythm helps to reduce the natural inclination of pianists to add rubato and excessive expression.

II. La soirée dans Grenade
La soirée dans Grenade uses the Arabic scale and mimics guitar strumming to evoke images of Granada, Spain. It was likely inspired by the Habanera in Maurice Ravel's suite for two pianos Sites Auriculaires, the Habanera being written in 1895. At the time of its writing, Debussy's only personal experience with the country was a few hours spent in San Sebastián de los Reyes near Madrid. Despite this, the Spanish composer Manuel de Falla said of the movement: "There is not even one measure of this music borrowed from the Spanish folklore, and yet the entire composition in its most minute details, conveys admirably Spain."

III. Jardins sous la pluie
Jardins sous la pluie describes a garden in the Normandy town of Orbec during an extremely violent rainstorm. Throughout the piece, there are sections that evoke the sounds of the wind blowing, a thunderstorm raging, and raindrops dropping. It makes use of the French folk melodies "Nous n'irons plus aux bois" and "Dodo, l'enfant do." Chromatic, whole tone, major and minor scales are used in this movement.

References

External links 
 

Suites by Claude Debussy
Compositions for solo piano
1903 compositions